Censier may refer to:
 Censier - Daubenton (Paris Métro), a station of the Parisian Metro
 Censier, a site of the University of Paris III: Sorbonne Nouvelle